NaviSoft was a web server, web publishing and web hosting company based in the United States that was the first company to offer an integrated solution that combined a high-performance programmable web server, NaviServer, with a WYSIWYG HTML authoring tool, NaviPress, and a public web site for hosting published pages, public.navisoft.com. NaviSoft was acquired by AOL on November 30, 1994.

Under AOL, the products and hosting service were rebranded AOLpress, AOLserver, and AOL PrimeHost, and AOL continued to offer those products and services through AOL's Internet Services Company. In 1995, AOL also acquired the Global Network Navigator (GNN) and offered NaviSoft's products under the GNN brand. as well.

AOL eventually stopped offering the WYSIWYG HTML authoring tool and web hosting services, but they continued to use AOLServer internally to run AOL's web services. In 1999, AOL released the source code to AOLServer as open-source under the GNU or AOLServer Public License. A friendly fork of version 4.10 of the AOLServer source code was released, and is still being developed and maintained, as NaviServer.

References

Defunct software companies of the United States
Companies based in California